The third season of Saltibum premiered on October 8, 2016 at 5:30 p.m. (BRT/AMT) on Rede Globo. Luciano Huck returned to host, alongside resident judges Eduardo Falcão and Roberto Biagioni. This season will have two winners (one male and one female), as it was the previous season.

Contestants

Scoring chart 

Key

Show details

Week 1 
Round 1 – Men & Women (Day 1)
 Celebrity guest: Tadeu Schmidt
Running order

Week 2 
Round 1 – Men & Women (Day 2)
 Celebrity guest: Ísis Valverde
Running order

Week 3 
Round 2 – Men
 Celebrity guest: Felipe Titto
Running order

Week 4 
Round 2 – Women
 Celebrity guest: Priscila Fantin
Running order

Week 5 
Round 3 – Men
 Celebrity guest: Daniel Dias
Running order

Week 6 
Round 3 – Women
 Celebrity guest: Rodrigo Simas
Running order

Week 7 
Round 4 – Men
 Celebrity guest: Viviane Araújo
Running order

Week 8 
Round 4 – Women
 Celebrity guest: José Aldo
Running order

Week 9 
Dive-off
 Celebrity guest: Marco Luque
Running order

Week 10 
Semifinals
 Celebrity guest: Mauro Naves
Running order

Week 11 
Finals
 Celebrity guests: Fernanda Gentil & Tino Marcos (artistic judges) and Hugo Parisi (technical judge)
Running order

References

External links 
 Saltibum on GShow.com

2016 Brazilian television seasons